Yunuslar is a light-rail station on the Karşıyaka Tram line of the Tram İzmir network. The station consists of an island platform serving two tracks. Yunuslar is located within the Karşıyaka Waterfront Park, on the south side of Cemal Gürsel Boulevard, near the Yunuslar Monument from which the station gets its name. Yunuslar station was opened on 11 April 2017, along with the entire tram line.

Connections
ESHOT operates city bus service on Girne Boulevard.

References
 

Railway stations opened in 2017
2017 establishments in Turkey
Karşıyaka District
Tram transport in İzmir